The 2013–14 UC Riverside Highlanders men's basketball team represented the University of California, Riverside during the 2013–14 NCAA Division I men's basketball season. The Highlanders are led by first year head coach Dennis Cutts and played their home games at the Student Recreation Center Arena as members of the Big West Conference. They finished the season 10–21, 5–11 in Big West play to finish in eighth place. They lost in the quarterfinals of the Big West Conference tournament to UC Irvine.

Season

Preseason
Sam Finley was the only recruit that UC Riverside signed in their 2013-14 class, and the shooting guard from Corona, California, signed his Letter of Intent on November 16, 2012. The 6'2", 180 pound guard was rated as a two-star prospect by ESPN.com. Finley averaged 19.4 points per game in his senior season for Centennial High School.

On July 10, 2013, Jim Wooldridge, who had been the Highlanders' head coach for the past six seasons, was named UC Riverside's interim athletic director, replacing Brian Wickstrom, who left to take the AD job at the University of Louisiana at Monroe. Wooldridge had amassed 70 wins over six years as the Highlanders' head coach. Longtime assistant coach Dennis Cutts was named as Wooldridge's interim successor.

Cutts announced the team's complete season schedule on July 23, 2013. The Highlanders' notable games featured road match-ups against San Diego State, Southern Utah, Air Force, and North Texas. UC Riverside also announced that they would play host to teams such as Montana State, Pepperdine, and Northern Illinois. The Highlanders' 16-game conference slate included one home game and one away game against each of the other eight members of the Big West Conference.

On August 14, 2013, Cutts announced the hiring of 23 year coaching veteran Steven Sauers to fill the open assistant coaching spot left vacant when Cutts took the head coaching job. Sauers had previously served as the director of basketball operations for the Seton Hall Pirates, and also spent time as an assistant for Marist and Iona.

The Highlanders played one preseason exhibition on November 1, against Pomona-Pitzer, winning by a score of 83–73. Chris Patton led the Highlanders with 27 points in the exhibition victory.

Roster

Schedule and results
Source: 

|-
!colspan=9 style=| Exhibition

|-
!colspan=9 style=| Non-conference games

|-
!colspan=9 style=| Conference games

|-
!colspan=9 style=| Big West tournament

References

UC Riverside Highlanders men's basketball seasons
UC Riverside